The 1991–92 Courage League National Division Two  was the fifth full season of rugby union  within the second tier of the English league system, currently known as the RFU Championship. 

London Scottish, the champions, were promoted to the Courage League National Division One for season 1992–93 along with the runner-up West Hartlepool. In last place, Liverpool St Helens became the first team to lose all their league matches in one season, and along with Plymouth Albion who finished one place above them, are relegated to Courage League National Division Three for the following season. Liverpool St Helens have been promoted or relegated in each of the five seasons of league rugby, and are relegated for the second season in succession.

Participating teams
There was a total of thirteen teams in the division, with each team meeting the other teams once to give total of twelve matches each. Joining the nine teams who remained in the division from last season were Moseley and Liverpool St Helens, who finished 12th and 13th respectively in Courage League Division One the previous year. It was Moseley's first season in the second tier while Liverpool St Helen's continued their "yo–yoing" between the top two division, having been promoted twice and relegated twice in the first four seasons. Last season's Division Three champions West Hartlepool and runner–up Morley both played in Division Two for the first time. Blackheath and Newcastle Gosforth are the only teams to have played every season in the second division.

Table

Sponsorship
National Division Two is part of the Courage Clubs Championship and is sponsored by Courage Brewery

See also
 English rugby union system

References 

N2
RFU Championship seasons